Siirala is a Finnish surname. Notable people with the surname include:

Antti Siirala (born 1979), Finnish classical pianist
Elina Siirala (born 1983), Finnish soprano and vocal coach
Martti Olavi Siirala (1922–2008), Finnish psychiatrist, psychoanalyst and philosopher

Finnish-language surnames